Yang Yilin (born 23 February 1999) is a Chinese footballer currently playing as a midfielder for Meizhou Hakka.

Club career
Yang Yilin would play for the Shandong Taishan youth team where he was sent out to Sao Paulo, Brazil for training before he was allowed to join fourth tier Spanish club Estudiantes de Murcia. With them he would make his senior debut on 27 August 2018 in a league game against UCAM Murcia B that ended in a 1-0 defeat. He would return to Shandong after a season and then eventually loaned out to second tier club Meizhou Hakka on 13 February 2020. At Meizhou he would make his first appearance for them on 13 September 2020 in a league game that saw them win 2-0 against Liaoning Shenyang Urban. On his return to Shandong he would be dropped to the reserve team throughout the 2021 Chinese Super League season. On 29 April 2022, Yang returned to Meizhou on a permanent transfer.

Career statistics
.

References

External links

1999 births
Living people
Sportspeople from Luoyang
Footballers from Henan
Chinese footballers
China youth international footballers
Chinese expatriate footballers
Association football midfielders
Tercera División players
China League One players
Shandong Taishan F.C. players
Meizhou Hakka F.C. players
Chinese expatriate sportspeople in Spain
Expatriate footballers in Spain